Mount Thor, officially gazetted as Thor Peak ( Qaisualuk "huge bedrock" or Kigutinnguaq "tooth-like"), is a mountain with an elevation of  located in Auyuittuq National Park, on Baffin Island, Nunavut, Canada. Despite its remoteness, this feature makes the mountain a popular rock climbing site. Camping is allowed, with several designated campsites located throughout the length of Akshayuk Pass. For climbers looking to scale Mount Thor, there is an established campsite a few kilometres north of its base, complete with windbreaks and emergency shelters.

The English naming of the mountain originates from Thor, the Norse thunder god.

Geography

Mount Thor is part of the Baffin Mountains which in turn form part of the Arctic Cordillera mountain range. The mountain consists of granite.

Geology 
This mountain consists of solid granite. The rock making up this formation have been metamorphosed multiple times through earth's history, causing this granitic layer to be pushed through other layers. The age of the rock ranges from 570 million years to 3.5 billion years (Pre-Cambrian), making it some of the oldest rock on earth. 

The peak and vertical drop itself are a product of glacial erosion, carved over millennia by seasonal glacial activity through the Akshayuk Pass, on the rim of which this mountain sits. Like other glacial channels, this pass has the characteristic U-shape which gives the mountain its vertical drop

Ascents
Donald Morton and Lyman Spitzer made the first recorded ascent of Mount Thor in 1965 during the Alpine Club of Canada expedition led by Pat Baird. Pat Baird also led the 1953 geophysical expedition during which Hans Weber, J. Rothlisberger and F. Schwarzenbach climbed the North Tower of Mount Asgard for the first time.

The first ascent of the west face was achieved by Earl Redfern, John Bagley, Eric Brand and Tom Bepler in 1985.  The first solo ascent of the West Face was completed by Jason 'Singer' Smith in 1998. The first free climb of the Southwest Buttress was made in 2012 by Bill Borger and John Furneaux.

See also
 Trango Towers – the tallest near-vertical drop on Earth
 Cerro Torre
 Half Dome

References

External links

  about Mt. Thor and other Akshayuk Pass features by writer Dave Levinthal

Thor
Thor
Thor
Thor
One-thousanders of Nunavut